"Sunless Saturday" is a song by American rock band Fishbone from their third studio album The Reality of My Surroundings. It remains, to this day, the band's highest charting single.

The music video for the song was directed by Spike Lee.

Track listing

Charts

References

External links
 Sunless Saturday on YouTube

Fishbone songs
1991 singles
Music videos directed by Spike Lee
1991 songs
Columbia Records singles
Song recordings produced by David Kahne